Imamzadeh Saleh is one of many imamzadeh mosques in Iran. The mosque is located at Tajrish Square in Tehran's northern Shemiran district. The mosque entombs the remains of Saleh, a son of the Twelver Shia Imam, Musa al-Kadhim, and is one of the most popular Shia shrines in northern Tehran.

History 
The main mausoleum building includes a large rectangular building with thick walls and solid inner space of almost 5. 6 square meters. In the year 700 AH Imam Zadeh Saleh there is an inscription that appears in the repair and alteration of entries has gone according to which the Kingdom of Ghazan Khan was at the same time. Imam Zadeh Saleh large wooden box inside the tomb probably belonged to the era of the late Safavid or Afsharid dynasties. Silver enshrine the eastern and north-eastern and western sides have netted enclosure is decorated with silver and wood lattice south side of the endowment of the late Mr. Mirza Saeed khan foreign minister late Qajar. The shrine is located on the north side entrance porch and the porch of the sanctuary, the tablet is rectangular adobe tile on its history in 1210 AH and the name of Fath-Ali Shah Qajar has been engraved on it.

Notable burials 
Mirza Nasrollah Khan Moshir od-Dowleh (1840-1907), prime minister (1906-07)
Hassan Pirnia Moshir od-Dowleh (1871-1935), scholar and prime minister (1918–20), (1922) and (1923)
Hossein Pirnia Mo'tamen ol-Molk (1874-1946), speaker of the Majles (1914–25) and (1927–28)
Mohammad Tadayyon (1881-1951), statesman
Majid Shahriari (1966-2010), engineer
Javad Mosadeghi (1949-2015), founder and chief executive officer, Islamic P&I Club
Masoumeh Ghavi (1987-2020), Telecom Engineer, Innocent Victim of Ukraine International Airlines Flight 752
Mahdieh Ghavi (1999-2020), Medical Student, Innocent Victim of Ukraine International Airlines Flight 752
Mohsen Fakhrizadeh (1958–2020), nuclear physicist and scientist regarded as the father of Iran's nuclear program

Memorial Day 
The custodians of Saleh Imamzadeh have appointed 5 Dhiqaadah(24 March) on the occasion of the day of commemoration of this Imamzadeh and the commemoration ceremony of Imamzadeh is held every year in 24 March in Astan

Gallery

See also
 List of Mosques in Iran
 Imamzadeh

References

External links
 
 History of Imam Zadeh Saleh from ITTO

Religious buildings and structures in Tehran
Ziyarat
Architecture in Iran